Metajapyx illinoiensis is a species of forcepstail in the family Japygidae. It is found in North America.

References

Diplura
Articles created by Qbugbot
Animals described in 1964